Carsten Klouman (21 August 1923 – 2 July 2004) was born in Oslo and was a Norwegian pianist, arranger and composer. He was the son of the actor Thoralf Klouman and the actress Borghild Johannessen.

He was a jazz pianist in the group String Swing and Jolly Seven, he led the Carsten Klouman Trio in 1954 with Frank Cook and Tore Birkedal before becoming musical director of the NRK Radio Orchestra and conducting the Norwegian Eurovision Song Contest entries on five occasions 1972, 1973, 1975, 1977 and 1978.

In 1988 he became chairman for TONO.

Honors 

 1966: Work of the year in Norwegian music, awarded by TONO and NOPA
 1971: Work of the year in Norwegian music, awarded by TONO and NOPA
 1972: Work of the year in Norwegian music, awarded by TONO and NOPA
 1983: Work of the year in Norwegian music, awarded by TONO and NOPA

References 

1923 births
2004 deaths
Musicians from Oslo
Norwegian musicians
Eurovision Song Contest conductors
20th-century conductors (music)